The Delaware State Bar Association (DSBA) is a voluntary bar association for the state of Delaware.  Around 90% of the attorneys in private practice in Delaware are members. The DSBA was founded in 1923.

Membership
The DSBA permits regular membership in the organization, as well as new admittee membership, associate membership, and student membership.  New admittees to the Bar are provided free membership to the association from the January after admittance to the end of the fiscal year.  In addition, members may elect to join any of 27 sections of the bar which concentrate on different areas of practice or common interests.

Members receive a discount on continuing legal education, as well as discounts on other legal products and services.  In July, 2017, the DSBA began offering free legal research to all active members.  The Delaware State Bar Insurance Services, Inc. (DSBIS), a wholly owned subsidiary of the DSBA, is an insurance agency which provides insurance to members.

Publications
The bar association publishes the semi-annual Delaware Law Review, with scholarly articles on legal subjects and issues, particularly focus on Delaware law, and the monthly Journal of the Delaware State Bar Association.

References

American state bar associations
Organizations established in 1923
1923 establishments in Delaware